The Double-Tongued Dictionary is an online dictionary. It catalogs a growing lexicon of undocumented or under-documented words on the fringes of English, focusing on slang, jargon, and new words.

Formerly known as the Double-Tongued Word , the dictionary strives to record terms and expressions that are omitted, or are poorly covered, in mainstream dictionaries. It also features definitions and citations of strange and unusual words or phrases such as "parergon," "epigenetics," and "bleeding deacon."

The information on this site is compiled, written and edited by lexicographer Grant Barrett.

References

External links
Double-Tongued Dictionary Website

Slang dictionaries
Online English dictionaries